Shane Boris (born 1981, Denver) is a film producer, and founder and creative producer at Cottage M, an independent production house. He is best known for the 2022 documentary films Fire of Love and Navalny, both of which were nominated for Academy Awards.

Biography
Boris was born and raised in Littleton, Colorado and attended high school at Colorado Academy, graduating in 2000. He studied religion and English at Oberlin College, and subsequently took a master's degree in international relations at Jawaharlal Nehru University in New Delhi, India. He began advising and then producing documentary films soon after. His first feature documentary as a producer, You’re Looking at Me Like I Live Here and I Don’t (2010), was shown on several seasons of PBS's Independent Lens. Fuck For Forest (2013), screened at various festivals including SXSW, and won Best Documentary at the Warsaw International Film Festival. The creative nonfiction film, Olmo and the Seagull (2015), premiered at Locarno and won Best Documentary at the Rio International Film Festival.  These Sleepless Nights  (2016) premiered at Sundance where it won Best Directing in the International Documentary Competition.
In 2020, The Edge of Democracy was nominated for an Oscar in the Documentary Feature category at the 92nd Academy Awards. In 2023, he was nominated for two Oscars at the 95th Academy Awards for Documentary Feature for Fire of Love and Navalny.

Filmography
Producer
Independent Lens, 1 episode - 2004
Elementary Cool - 2009
You’re Looking at Me Like I Live Here and I Don’t - 2010
Fuck For Forest - 2013
Olmo and the Seagull - 2015
All These Sleepless Nights - 2016
Break - 2016
Walden: Life in the Woods - 2017
The Seer and the Unseen - 2019
The Edge of Democracy - 2019
Silent Rose - 2020
Stray - 2020
The Last Cruise - 2021
Fire of Love - 2022
Navalny - 2022
King Coal - 2023

Executive Producer
Band - 2022

Awards and nominations

References

External links

Cottage M (Founder)
Joon Incubator (Founder)

Living people
1981 births
American film producers
Oberlin College alumni
Jawaharlal Nehru University alumni
Producers of Best Documentary Feature Academy Award winners